An apostolic constitution is the most solemn form of legislation issued by the pope. The use of the term constitution comes from Latin , which referred to any important law issued by the Roman emperor, and is retained in church documents because of the inheritance that the canon law of the Catholic Church received from Roman law.

By their nature, apostolic constitutions are addressed to the public. Generic constitutions use the title apostolic constitution and treat on solemn matters of the church, such as the promulgation of laws or definitive teachings. The forms dogmatic constitution and pastoral constitution are titles sometimes used to be more descriptive as to the document's purpose.

Apostolic constitutions are issued as papal bulls because of their solemn, public form. Among types of papal legislation, apostolic letters issued motu proprio are next in solemnity.

Introduction
Generic constitutions contain the following introduction:
[Pope name], Bishop
Servant of the Servants of God 
For an everlasting memorial/eternal memory/etc.

Examples of apostolic constitutions

16th century 
 Quo primum (1570) Pius V's Apostolic Constitution on the Tridentine Mass

19th century 
 Ineffabilis Deus (1854) Pius IX's Dogmatic Constitution on the Immaculate Conception of Mary
 Ad Universalis Ecclesiae (1862) Pius IX's Papal Constitution dealing with the conditions for admission to religious orders of men in which solemn vows are prescribed
 Romanos Pontifices (1881) by Pope Leo XIII

20th century 
 Bis Saeculari (1948), Pope Pius XII on Sodality of Our Lady 
 Munificentissimus Deus (1950) Pope Pius XII's Dogmatic Constitution on the Assumption of Mary
 Exsul Familia (1952) Pope Pius XII's Constitution on Migration
 Veterum sapientia (1962) Pope John XXIII's Apostolic Constitution on the promotion of the study of Latin
 Dei verbum (1965) Pope Paul VI's Dogmatic Constitution on Divine Revelation
 Lumen gentium (1964) by Pope Paul VI
 Paenitemini (1966) Pope Paul VI's Apostolic Constitution on Fasting and Abstinence in the Roman Catholic Church 
 Missale Romanum (1969) Pope Paul VI's Apostolic Constitution on the revised liturgy
 Romano Pontifici eligendo (1975) Pope Paul VI's Apostolic Constitution on the election of the Roman pontiff
 Scriptuarum Thesaurus (1979) Pope John Paul II's Apostolic Constitution on the promulgation New Vulgate as "Typical" for liturgical use 
 Ut sit (1982) Pope John Paul II's Apostolic Constitution raising Opus Dei (Latin for "The Work of God") to the rank of a Personal Prelature (similar to a diocese, but grouping people by some peculiar pastoral reason instead of by where they live)
 Sacrae Disciplinae Leges (1983) Pope John Paul II's constitution instituting the 1983 Code of Canon Law
 Pastor bonus (1988) Pope John Paul II's rules on the re-organisation of the Roman Curia
 Ex corde ecclesiae (1990)   John Paul II's rules on Catholic universities
 Fidei depositum (1992) Pope John Paul II's Apostolic Constitution on the new Catechism of the Catholic Church
 Universi Dominici gregis (1996) Pope John Paul II's rules on electing the Roman Pontiff (the Pope)

21st century 
  Anglicanorum coetibus (2009) Pope Benedict XVI's rules for providing for Personal Ordinariates for Anglican laypeople and clergy wishing to enter into full communion with the Catholic Church.
 Vultum Dei quaerere (2016)  Pope Francis' rules about women's contemplative life.
 Veritatis gaudium (2017)  Pope Francis' reform of pontifical universities and faculties.
 Episcopalis communio (2018) strengthens the power and influence of the Synod of Bishops.
 Pascite gregem Dei. (2021)
 Praedicate evangelium (2022) about the Roman Curia and its service to the Church and the world.

References

Citations

Sources 
 Huels, John M.  "A theory of juridical documents based on canons 29-34", Studia Canonica, 1998, vol. 32, no. 2, pp. 337–370.
 Beal, John P., James A. Coriden, Thomas J. Green. New Commentary on the Code of Canon Law: Commissioned by the Canon Law Society of America (New York: Paulist Press, 2000).

 
Catholic canonical documents
Christian genres
Christian terminology
Sources of law